Rossetto can mean:

People
 Héctor Rossetto - Argentine chess player who became an International Grandmaster in 1960
 Louis Rossetto - American journalist. He is best known as the founder and former publisher of Wired magazine

Food and drinks
 An alternative name used in Italy for the white wine grape Trebbiano
 An alternative name used in Italy for the red wine grape Grignolino

See also 
 Roseto (disambiguation)